The UB Mingoes men's soccer programme represents the University of the Bahamas in all soccer competitions. The program won the 2017–18 BFA Senior League. The team is based in Nassau, Bahamas.

History 
The UB Mingoes men's soccer program began as the College of the Bahamas Caribs, before being rebranded in 2017.

Colors and badge 
On February 28, 2017 the Government of the Bahamas announced the Mingoes as the university's name and revealed the mascot. The main colours and blue, black, and white.

Stadium 
The program plays on the soccer fields adjacent to Thomas Robinson Stadium.

Honours

See also 
 UB Mingoes

References 

Football clubs in the Bahamas
University and college association football clubs